Local elections were held in Bataan on May 9, 2022, as part of the 2022 Philippine general election. Voters will select candidates for all local positions: a town mayor, vice mayor, and town councilors, as well as members of the Sangguniang Panlalawigan, a vice-governor, a governor, and representatives for the province's three congressional districts in the Philippine House of Representatives.

Results

Governor

Per City/Municipality

Vice Governor

Per City/Municipality

Congressional Districts

1st District

2nd District

3rd District

Provincial Board

1st District

2nd District

3rd District 

|colspan=5 bgcolor=black|

City and Municipality

1st District
 Municipalities: Abucay, Hermosa, Orani, Samal

Abucay

Hermosa

Orani

Samal

2nd District
 City: Balanga
 Municipalities: Limay, Orion, Pilar

Balanga

Limay

Orion

Pilar

3rd District
 Municipalities: Bagac, Dinalupihan, Mariveles, Morong

Bagac

Dinalupihan

Mariveles

Morong

References 

2022 Philippine local elections
May 2022 events in the Philippines
2022 elections in Central Luzon